Belerica Oquendo (born 12 February 2001) is a Puerto Rican footballer who plays as a defender for the Puerto Rico women's national team.

Early life

Oquendo attended Trinity High School. She played youth soccer with Dallas Kicks FC.

International career

In November 2018, Oquendo was called up by Puerto Rico for two friendlies against Guatemala. On 10 November, she started in the 1–0 away loss at Estadio del Ejército.

References

2001 births
Living people
Women's association football defenders
American women's soccer players
Puerto Rican women's footballers
Puerto Rico women's international footballers
Soccer players from Texas
TCU Horned Frogs women's soccer players
Troy Trojans athletes